Sir Apenera Pera Short  (4 February 1916 – 15 June 2011) was a Cook Islands politician and from 1990 to 2000 was the Queen's Representative in the Cook Islands.

Short was born on Rarotonga. He was a school teacher in Ngatangiia at from 1951 to 1956 was a teacher at Tereora College in Avarua. In 1939, he married Maui Timata i te Rui Cowan; the couple had 14 children, including two sets of twins.

In the 1965 Cook Islands election, Short was elected as a member of the Cook Islands Legislative Assembly and joined the Cabinet of the ruling Cook Islands Party as a Minister of the Crown and Deputy Premier. Short held this position until 1978.

On 19 December 1990, Short was appointed to succeed Sir Tangaroa Tangaroa as the Queen's Representative. Short held this position until 14 December 2000. He was succeeded by Lawrence Greig, who held the position in an acting capacity until Frederick Tutu Goodwin was appointed in 2001.

Honours
Short was appointed a Knight Commander of the Order of the British Empire (KBE) by Queen Elizabeth II in 1995.

In March 1997 he was appointed a commander of the Order of Tahiti Nui.

Death
Short died at his home in Muri Beach, Rarotonga, aged 95.

Notes

References
Howard Henry (2002). Rise and Rise of the Cook Islands Party: Cook Islands Politics and the Road to Self-government: on 4 August 1965 (Auckland: Sovereign Pacific Publishing).
Ron Crocombe (ed.) (1979). Cook Islands Politics: The Inside Story (Auckland: Institute of Pacific Studies).

External links
Who's Who in the Cook Islands

1916 births
2011 deaths
Deputy Prime Ministers of the Cook Islands
Queen's Representatives in the Cook Islands
People from Rarotonga
Knights Commander of the Order of the British Empire
Members of the Parliament of the Cook Islands
Cook Island schoolteachers
Cook Islands Party politicians
Cook Island knights
Commanders of the Order of Tahiti Nui